The Palace Hotel is a building located in Downtown Missoula, Montana. Built in 1909, it became one of Missoula's first multi-story hotels. Today, the building houses apartments. Its architectural style is Renaissance revival. The building was added to the National Register of Historic Places in 1982.

History  
The building opened in 1909 as a full-service hotel. Its structural system is a rigid frame; Its facade system is applied masonry, and it has a concrete base.

References 

Hotel buildings completed in 1909
Renaissance Revival architecture in Montana
Hotel buildings on the National Register of Historic Places in Montana
Residential buildings on the National Register of Historic Places in Montana
National Register of Historic Places in Missoula, Montana
1909 establishments in Montana